Tuomo Hakala (born 9 October 1957) is a retired Finnish footballer. During his club career, Hakala solely played for RoPS Rovaniemi. He made 9 appearances for the Finland national team, without scoring.

Career statistics

International goals

External links

1957 births
Living people
Finnish footballers
Association football forwards
Rovaniemen Palloseura players
Finland international footballers